BNS Padma is a  offshore patrol vessel of the Bangladesh Navy. She is serving the Bangladesh Navy from 2013.

Career
The ship was ordered on 2 May 2010. The contract was awarded to Khulna Shipyard in Khulna, Bangladesh, where the keel was laid in 2011. It was built in collaboration with Hudong Shipyard, with the Chinese supplying designs and materials and supervising the construction. She cost 580 million Bangladeshi taka (equivalent to $7.1 million in 2012). The ship was launched on 8 October 2012, and commissioned on 24 January 2013. She is currently serving under the command of Commander Flotilla West (COMFLOT WEST).

Design
The vessel has a displacement of 350 tonnes. Her complement is 45 persons and can carry out missions lasting up to seven days at a time.

Armament
The ship is equipped with a pairs of 20 mm anti-aircraft guns and a pair of 37 mm guns. Padma can also carry naval mines and MANPADS.

See also
List of active ships of the Bangladesh Navy

References

Ships of the Bangladesh Navy
Patrol vessels of the Bangladesh Navy
Padma-class Patrol Vessel
2012 ships
Ships built at Khulna Shipyard